Kačinskas is a Lithuanian language family name. It corresponds to Polish language surname Kaczyński.

The surname may refer to:
Jeronimas Kačinskas (1907–2005), Lithuanian composer
Virgilijus Kačinskas, Lithuanian politician 

Lithuanian-language surnames